Narenj Kola-ye Olya (also Romanized as Nārenj Kolā-ye ‘Olyā; also known as Nārenj Kolā) is a village in Machian Rural District, Kelachay District, Rudsar County, Gilan Province, Iran. At the 2006 census, its population was 93, in 26 families.

References 

Populated places in Rudsar County